How High is the Sky (released 14 November 2011 in Oslo, Norway by label Bolage – BLGCD 018) is a Jazz album by the Norwegian jazz singer Kjersti Stubø Quartet feat. «MiNensemblet»

Critical reception 

Stubø pick some of her favorite tunes on his second solo album, and along with her regular quartet and the MiN ensemble, she offers music of the highest quality her, sprawling and full of surprises. Jørn Øien has done a wonderful job with the arrangements, ranging all the way from the playful riffs to steel blue textures associations with Gil Evans, Debussy and Messiaen.

The Norwegian newspaper Dagbladet review awarded the album dice 5.

Track listing 
«Charade» (6:14)
«If I were a bell» (3:48)
«Some other time» (5:54)
«All of you» (3:24)
«Åh, så intensiv» (5:43)
«You've changed» (7:34)
«If you never come to me» (3:41)
«How deep is the ocean» (5:50)
«Radio Ga Ga» (5:01)
«Mood» (2:17)

Musicians

Kjersti Stubø Quartet 
Kjersti Stubø - vocals
Jørn Øien - piano
Håkon Mjåset Johansen - drums
Jon Rune Strøm - double bass

MiNensemblet 
Øivind Nussle – violin
Tor Johan Bøen - violin
Kate Read – viola 
Hans-Urban Andersson – cello
Jon Sjøen – contrabass
Ole Kristoffersen – clarinet
Inge Rolland – flute
Anton Biehe - bassoon

References 

Kjersti Stubø albums
2011 albums